Youssef Maaraf (born 21 July 1996) is a Tunisian handball player for Al Ahly and the Tunisian national team.

He represented Tunisia at the 2019 World Men's Handball Championship.

References

1996 births
Living people
Tunisian male handball players
Expatriate handball players
Tunisian expatriate sportspeople in Egypt
Competitors at the 2018 Mediterranean Games
Competitors at the 2022 Mediterranean Games
Mediterranean Games silver medalists for Tunisia
Mediterranean Games medalists in handball
20th-century Tunisian people
21st-century Tunisian people